The second inauguration of Thomas Jefferson as president of the United States took place on Monday, March 4, 1805 in the Senate Chamber of the United States Capitol. The inauguration marked the commencement of the second four-year term of Thomas Jefferson as president and the first four-year term of George Clinton as vice president.  Giving the oath of office was Chief Justice John Marshall.

Background 

Unlike the contentious election of 1800, in which Jefferson narrowly defeated strong opposition from  Federalists and a bipartisan conspiracy to replace him with his own running mate and campaign manager, Aaron Burr, with the House of Representatives determining the winner, the 1804 election was far less dramatic. The Federalists, severely weakened, struggled to muster serious opposition and to select a candidate. They settled on Charles Cotesworth Pinckney of South Carolina. Due to several years of tension and mutual dislike between Jefferson and Burr, Burr was dropped from the Democratic-Republican ticket and replaced with George Clinton. Jefferson won the election in a landslide.

Inauguration 

Jefferson rode to the Capitol on horseback on March 4, 1805, but much of Congress had already left after the body had adjourned following Burr's farewell address before the Senate a couple of days earlier. Thus the inaugural ceremony was modest and appeared anticlimactic. The president spoke softly and quietly, as he was known for, and provided copies of his inaugural address. Jefferson wore a black suit and silk stockings for the inauguration. In the speech, he addressed the recent acquisition of Louisiana, the Federalists' diminishing influence, and the need for freedom of the press, though he also criticized recent press attacks against him.

See also 
First inauguration of Thomas Jefferson
Presidency of Thomas Jefferson
1804 United States presidential election

References

External links

More documents from the Library of Congress
Text of Jefferson's Second Inaugural Address

1805 in Washington, D.C.
1805 in American politics
Presidency of Thomas Jefferson
United States presidential inaugurations
March 1805 events